There are 36 New York State Historic Markers located in Manhattan, which is coextensive with New York County in the state of New York. The markers are no longer maintained by the state but a list is maintained by the Association of Public Historians of New York State.

See also
List of New York State Historic Markers
National Register of Historic Places listings in New York
List of National Historic Landmarks in New York

References

Buildings and structures in Manhattan
Historic sites in New York City
History of Manhattan
Landmarks in New York City
Manhattan-related lists
New York